Milan Ribar (21 November 1930 – 26 May 1996) was a Bosnian professional football manager and former player.

He is the only manager in Željezničar history to have won the Yugoslav First League.

Playing career
Ribar played for hometown club Željezničar on two occasions (1950–1953 and 1956–1960) and Borac Banja Luka (1953–1956). For Željezničar he made 65 league appearances and scored 2 goals. Ribar was known for being a very rough player.

Managerial career
Ribar managed Željezničar, Yugoslavia (co-manager), Iraklis, AEL 1964 FC, Čelik Zenica, Sarıyer and Zeytinburnuspor.

With Željezničar, he won the 1971–72 Yugoslav First League.

Honours

Player
Željezničar 
Yugoslav Second League: 1956–57 (zone II A)

Manager
Željezničar 
Yugoslav First League: 1971–72

References

1930 births
1996 deaths
Footballers from Sarajevo
Burials at Bare Cemetery, Sarajevo
Association football defenders
Yugoslav footballers
Bosnia and Herzegovina footballers
FK Željezničar Sarajevo players
FK Borac Banja Luka players
Yugoslav Second League players
Yugoslav First League players
Yugoslav football managers
FK Željezničar Sarajevo managers
Yugoslavia national football team managers
Iraklis Thessaloniki F.C. managers
Athlitiki Enosi Larissa F.C. managers
NK Čelik Zenica managers
Sarıyer S.K. managers
Zeytinburnuspor managers
Yugoslav First League managers
Super League Greece managers
Süper Lig managers
Yugoslav expatriate football managers
Expatriate football managers in Greece
Yugoslav expatriate sportspeople in Greece
Expatriate football managers in Turkey
Yugoslav expatriate sportspeople in Turkey